Philippe François Pinel, known as Dumanoir (31 July 1806 – 16 November 1865), was a French playwright and librettist.

Biography 
Dumanoir was born in Capesterre-Belle-Eau, Guadeloupe. He was the son of Mrs. Pinel-Dumanoir, whose family planted the palm trees lining the Allée Dumanoir in Guadeloupe. He left Guadeloupe in 1816. Dumanoir wrote in the theatrical genre of Comédie en vaudevilles. He was director of the Théâtre des Variétés from 1837 to 1839. In 1844, he wrote in collaboration with Adolphe d'Ennery, an eponymous drama about Don César de Bazan, one of the characters in Ruy Blas by Victor Hugo.

He died in Pau.

List of major works

Plays 
 1842: Le Chevalier d'Éon, comedy in 3 acts, (with Jean-François Bayard), Théâtre des Variétés
 1839: Les Premières Armes de Richelieu (with Jean-François Bayard), Théâtre du Palais Royal
 1840: Indiana et Charlemagne (with Jean-François Bayard), Théâtre du Palais Royal
 1842: Ma maîtresse et ma femme, comédie-vaudeville in 1 act, (with Adolphe d'Ennery), Théâtre des Variétés
 1843: Les Hures-Graves (with Clairville and Paul Siraudin), Théâtre du Palais Royal
 1844:  (with Adolphe d'Ennery), Théâtre de la Porte Saint-Martin
 1845: Le Code des femmes, Théâtre du Palais Royal
 1846: Gentil-Bernard ou L'Art d'aimer (with Clairville), Théâtre des Variétés
 1849: , comédie en vaudevilles in 3 acts (with Eugène Labiche and Clairville), Théâtre du Palais Royal
 1853: La Case de l'oncle Tom, (with Adolphe d'Ennery), Théâtre de l'Ambigu-Comique
 1857: Les Bourgeois gentilshommes, comedy in 3 acts, in prose, Théâtre du Gymnase
 1862: Les Invalides du mariage, comedy in 3 acts (with Lafargue), Théâtre du Gymnase

Opera and ballet 
 1840: La Perruche, opéra-comique in 1 act (with Louis Clapisson and Henri Dupin)
 1840: Grisélidis ballet by Adolphe Adam
 1845: Maritana, opera by William Vincent Wallace (based on the play Don César de Bazan)
 1862: La Chatte merveilleuse, opera by Albert Grisar, libretto written with Adolphe d'Ennery (1811-1899)
 1863: La Mule de Pédro, opera by Victor Massé
 1872: Don César de Bazan, opera by Jules Massenet (based on the play Don César de Bazan)

Filmography
Don Caesar de Bazan, directed by Robert G. Vignola (1915, based on the play Don César de Bazan)
Don Cesar, Count of Irun, directed by Luise Kolm and Jacob Fleck (Austria, 1918, based on the play Don César de Bazan)
The Adventurer, directed by J. Gordon Edwards (1920, based on the play Don César de Bazan)
Rosita, directed by Ernst Lubitsch (1923, based on the play Don César de Bazan)
The Spanish Dancer, directed by Herbert Brenon (1923, based on the play Don César de Bazan)
Don Cesare di Bazan, directed by Riccardo Freda (Italy, 1942, based on the play Don César de Bazan)
The Seventh Sword, directed by Riccardo Freda (Italy, 1962, based on the play Don César de Bazan)

Decorations
  – Officer of the Legion of Honour   14 August 1965

References

Sources 
 American-Cyclopaedia-Pinel
 Brown University Library – Dumanoir

1806 births
1865 deaths
French opera librettists
French ballet librettists
French people of Guadeloupean descent
19th-century French dramatists and playwrights
19th-century pseudonymous writers